The William and Winifred Bowness Photography Prize is an Australian prize for photography awarded by the Museum of Australian Photography. The prize first awarded in 2006. The prize money for the award in 2017 is

History 
Established in 2006 to promote excellence in photography, the annual William and Winifred Bowness Photography Prize is an initiative of the MGA Foundation.

The Bowness Photography Prize has quickly become Australia's most important photography prize. It is also one of the country's most open prizes for photography. In the past, finalists have included established and emerging photographers, art and commercial photographers. All film-based and digital work from amateurs and professionals is accepted. There are no thematic restrictions. In its first year the winner was awarded $10,000. As the prize has grown in prominence the prize money has also increased with the 2017 winner to be awarded with $30,000 and for the first time in the history of the prize, the winning work will be acquired for the Monash Gallery of Art, City of Monash Collection.

Each year three Honourable Mentions will also be acknowledged along with a People's Choice Award of $1,000 which is announced at the end of the exhibition.

2017 
In 2017 the prize money awarded has been increased to $30,000 and for the first time, the winning work will be acquired for the Monash Gallery of Art, City of Monash Collection.

The finalists for 2017 have been announced, the exhibition will include 59 works from 61 artists.

Prize winners

2006
Kathy Mackey with "Reliquary 1" a pigment ink-jet print on cotton paper from an unnamed series of young women juxtaposing human skin with metallic and reflective objects.

2007
Ray Cook with "For God's sake, somebody throw a pie" a gelatin silver print from the series "Oblivion"

2008
Nat Thomas and Concertina Inserra with "Portrait of mother and daughter" a chromogenic print from the series "after Mirka"  inspired by the artist Mirka Mora

2009
Paul Knight with "14 months #01" a chromogenic print from an unnamed series of photographs showing couples in sexual embraces from an aerial perspective.

2010
Lee Grant with "Mary with her daughters Aja and Adau, and her granddaughter Nankir" a pigment ink-jet print from the series "New Australians: Sudanese migrants in suburbia"

2011
Jacky Redgate with "Light throw (mirrors) #4" a chromogenic print from the still-life series "Light throw (mirrors) 2010–11"

2012
Jesse Marlow with "Laser vision" a chromogenic print from the street photography series "Don't just tell them, show them"

2013
Pat Brassington with "Shadow boxer" a pigment ink-jet print from the series "Quill"

2014
Petrina Hicks with "Venus" a pigment ink-jet print from the series "The shadows" using portraiture to deal with ideas of beauty and representation in art history.

2015
Joseph McGlennon with "Florilegium #1" a pigment ink-jet print from the series "Florilegium" showing animals in exotic landscapes inspired by naturalist Joseph Banks

2016 
Valerie Sparks won $25,000 with "Prospero's Island – North East" a pigment ink-jet print from the series "Prospero's Island", which digitally combined images of Tasmania to become the setting of Shakespeare's "The Tempest".

2017 
The winner of the 2017 Bowness Photography prize was announced on 19 October 2017. Polixeni Papapetrou won with her work ‘Delphi’ (2016) a pigment ink-jet print from the series "Eden" depicting young women wearing floral dresses in front of floral backgrounds; merging figure and ground. Three honorable mentions were awarded to Del Kathryn Barton, Danica Chappell and Jenny Pollak.

2018 
The winner of the 2018 Bowness Photography prize was announced on 11 October 2018. Melbourne-based, Iranian-born artist Hoda Afshar won for her photograph ‘Portrait of Behrouz Boochani, Manus Island’ (2018) a pigment ink-jet print from the series "Remain". Three honorable mentions were awarded to Shelley Horan, Darren Sylvester and Cyrus Tang.

2019 
Katrin Koenning with "Three" a triptych of pigment ink-jet prints from the series "Lake Mountain" showing bushland recovering from bushfires.

2020 
Christian Thompson with "Rule of three" four chromogenic prints from the series "Flower walls  2018–" showing the artist immersed in colourful arrangements of Australian native flora.

2021 
Lillian O'Neil with "Drawing to a close" a collage of black and white pigment ink-jet prints.

2022 
Amos Gebhardt with "Wallaby" a chromogenic print on a light box from an unnamed series of native animal x-rays.

References

Photography awards
2006 establishments in Australia
Awards established in 2006
Australian art awards